Aeroflot-Plus was Aeroflot's VIP passenger charter subsidiary, controlled by Austria's Jetalliance and based at Sheremetyevo Airport, Moscow.

Fleet

References

External links

Homepage (Russian)

Defunct airlines of Russia
Former Aeroflot divisions